Proline-rich transmembrane protein 2 is a protein that in humans is encoded by the PRRT2 gene.

Structure and tissue distribution 

This gene encodes a transmembrane protein containing a proline-rich domain in its N-terminal half. Studies in mice suggest that it is predominantly expressed in brain and spinal cord in embryonic and postnatal stages.

Clinical significance 

Mutations in this gene are associated with a number of movement disorders, most commonly paroxysmal kinesigenic dyskinesia where approximately 1/3 of cases will harbor mutations in PRRT2. It has also been associated with episodic ataxias, and in particular in combination with various types of epilepsy. Mutations in PRRT2  lead also to hemiplegic migraine.

See also
 Paroxysmal kinesogenic choreoathetosis
 Hemiplegic migraine

References

External links
 GeneReviews/NIH/NCBI/UW entry on Familial Paroxysmal Kinesigenic Dyskinesia
  OMIM entries on Familial Paroxysmal Kinesigenic Dyskinesia
 NCBI gene

Neurological disorders